Markušica is a village and a municipality in Vukovar-Syrmia County in eastern Croatia. Markušica is located south of the  river Vuka and northwest of the town of Vinkovci. Landscape of the Markušica Municipality is marked by the Pannonian Basin plains and agricultural fields of corn, wheat, common sunflower and sugar beet.

The modern day municipality was established in 1997 by the UNTAES administration as one of new predominantly Serb municipalities in order to ensure access to local self-government to Serb community in the region. Alongside Markušica it includes villages of Gaboš, Karadžićevo, Ostrovo and Podrinje. Before the United Nations administrator implemented anty-gerrymandering reorganization, Markušica and Podrinje were a part of the Tordinci Municipality, while Karadžićevo, Ostrvo and Gaboš were linked to Jarmina Municipality making Serb community minority in both of them.

Markušica Municipality is connected with the surrounding area via D518 road and L209 Vinkovci–Gaboš–Osijek railway with local stations in Gaboš and Ostrovo.

Geography
River Vuka flows through the municipality and territory of the municipality is completely flat very fertile black soil. It is connected by D518 highway with rest of country.

History
One Scordisci archaeological site in Markušica dating back to late La Tène culture was excavated in the 1970s and 1980s as a part of rescue excavations in eastern Croatia. Archaeological site was a part of the settlement network of Scordisci in the area of Vinkovci.

Markušica was one of the feudal villages that existed in the region before the Ottoman rule in Hungary. After the end of Great Turkish War village was settled by Eastern Orthodox Vlachs from surrounding areas and the eastern Bosnia. In 1736 there was 40 inhabited houses in Markušica. In 1866 this number increased at 192 houses and 1003 inhabitants out of which 902 were Eastern Orthodox.

The modern day Municipality of Markušica was established by the decision of the United States diplomat and at the time Transitional Administrator for Eastern Slavonia, Baranja and Western Sirmium Jacques Paul Klein. As the region was directly governed as an UN protectorate Transitional Administrator was the highest authority responsible for administrative affairs. Markušica Municipality was established as one of new predominantly Serb municipalities in order to ensure access to local self-government to Serb community in the region. Prior to the decision international community expressed concerns over the perceived gerrymandering, disenfranchisement of refugees and minority representation.

Demographics

Population
There are 2 555 inhabitants, the majority of the population which are Serbs, who make up 90.10% of the population according to the 2011 population census.

Languages

Due to the local minority population, the Markušica municipality prescribe the use of not only Croatian as the official language, but the Serbian language and Serbian Cyrillic alphabet as well.

Religion

Most of the population are Serbian Orthodox that are practicing their religion in the church that was built in 1810 and re-built in 1989.

Politics

Joint Council of Municipalities
The Municipality of Markušica is one of seven Serb majority member municipalities within the Joint Council of Municipalities, inter-municipal sui generis organization of ethnic Serb community in eastern Croatia established on the basis of Erdut Agreement. As Serb community constitute majority of the population of the municipality it is represented by 2 delegated Councillors at the Assembly of the Joint Council of Municipalities, double the number of Councilors to the number from Serb minority municipalities in Eastern Croatia.

Municipality government
The municipality assembly is composed of 13 representatives plus additional seats for municipality minority groups if they don't get proportional number of seats.  Assembly members come from electoral lists winning  more than 5% of votes. Dominant party in the municipality since the reintegration of eastern Slavonia in 1998 is Independent Democratic Serb Party. 681 or 33,32 % out of 2.044 voters participated in 2017 Croatian local elections with 93,69 % valid votes. With 92,80% and 632 votes Budimir Brača from Independent Democratic Serb Party was elected as municipality major. As of 2017, the member parties/lists are:

|- style="background-color:#E9E9E9" align=center
!colspan=2|Party
!Votes
!%
!Seats
|-
| bgcolor=#C50200|
|align=left valign=top|Independent Democratic Serb Party||638||100,00||13 
|-
|align=left colspan=2|Invalid/blank votes||43||6,31||—
|-
|align=left colspan=2|Total||681||100||—
|-
|align=left colspan=2|Registered voters/turnout||2.044||33,32||—
|-
|align=left colspan=8|

|-
|align=left colspan=8|Source page 57-58 
|}

Economy
Markušica is underdeveloped municipality which is statistically classified as the First Category Area of Special State Concern by the Government of Croatia.

Culture

Points of Interest

Markušica Municipality is famous for a monument dedicated to a soldier killed in World War II. The village has a unique monument to a female Soviet pilot from the Red Army, who fought against the Nazis and whose plane was shot down here. The village also has an Eastern Orthodox Church from 1810, which was damaged in

Associations and Institutions
The village has a volunteer fire department.

Settlements

The municipality consists of the following settlements:
 Gaboš, population 516
 Karadžićevo, population 194
 Markušica, population 1,009
 Ostrovo, population 612
 Podrinje, population 224

See also
 Vukovar-Srijem County
 Church of Pentecost, Markušica
 Joint Council of Municipalities

References

Municipalities of Croatia
Populated places in Vukovar-Syrmia County
Populated places in Syrmia
Joint Council of Municipalities
Serb communities in Croatia
Archaeological sites in Croatia
La Tène culture